Antonio Mora (16 August 1919 – 26 July 1992) was a Costa Rican sports shooter. He competed in the 50 metre pistol event at the 1968 Summer Olympics.

References

1919 births
1992 deaths
Costa Rican male sport shooters
Olympic shooters of Costa Rica
Shooters at the 1968 Summer Olympics
Sportspeople from San José, Costa Rica